Claudio Ortiz (born 29 July 1981) is an Argentinean retired footballer.

References

1981 births
Living people
Argentine footballers
Argentine expatriate footballers
Expatriate footballers in Uruguay
Expatriate footballers in Morocco
Club Atlético Sarmiento footballers
Wydad AC players
Club Almagro players
Association football forwards
Association football midfielders